Alexandra Mařasová (born 26 October 1965) is a Czech former alpine skier who competed for Czechoslovakia in the 1984 Winter Olympics.

References

External links
 

1965 births
Living people
Czech female alpine skiers
Czechoslovak female alpine skiers
Olympic alpine skiers of Czechoslovakia
Alpine skiers at the 1984 Winter Olympics